Atlanta Reign is an American esports team founded in 2018 that competes in the Overwatch League (OWL). The Reign began playing competitive Overwatch in the 2019 season.

All rostered players during the OWL season (including the playoffs) are included, even if they did not make an appearance.

All-time roster

References

External links 
 Atlanta Reign roster

 
Atlanta Reign
Atlanta